Arthur Charles Day (8 August 1933 – 15 July 2022) was an Australian cricketer. He played four first-class cricket matches for Victoria between 1955 and 1957.

See also
 List of Victoria first-class cricketers

References

External links
 

1933 births
2022 deaths
Australian cricketers
Victoria cricketers
Cricketers from Melbourne